San Lorenzo Cacaotepec  is a town and municipality in Oaxaca in south-western Mexico. The municipality covers an area of 12.76 km2. 
It is part of the Etla District in the Valles Centrales region.
As of 2005, the municipality had a total population of 11559.

References

Municipalities of Oaxaca